Kuryana Azis (10 April 1952 – 8 March 2021) was an Indonesian politician.

Biography
He was born in Tanjung Kemala, Baturaja, Ogan Komering Ulu, South Sumatra.

He was the regent of Ogan Komering Ulu from 2015 until his death on 8 March 2021, due to COVID-19 during the COVID-19 pandemic in Indonesia.

References

Indonesian politicians
1952 births
2021 deaths
People from South Sumatra
Deaths from the COVID-19 pandemic in Indonesia